Ployart-et-Vaurseine is a commune in the Aisne department in Hauts-de-France in northern France.

Population

With a population of only 21 in 2018, Ployart-et-Vaurseine is the 3rd least populated town in the department of Aisne.

Tower of Vaurseine
Within the commune is a medieval tower, built circa 1400.

See also
Communes of the Aisne department

References

External links

 Aisne Department Website

Communes of Aisne
Aisne communes articles needing translation from French Wikipedia